Nicholas Soussanin (born 16 January 1889, Yalta, Taurida Governorate, Russian Empire (present-day Crimea, Ukraine) – 27 April 1975, New York City) was an actor from the  Russian Empire who settled and worked in the United States. He was married to the film star Olga Baclanova from 1929–39, and was the grandfather of actress Lanna Saunders.

He had at least two children (a son born from a previous relationship before his marriage to Olga Baclanova), and a son, Nicholas Soussanin Jr., born with Baclanova in 1930.

Filmography

Bibliography
 Kulik, Karol. Alexander Korda: The Man Who Could Work Miracles. Arlington House (1975 edition), later Virgin Books (1990 edition); /

References

External links

1889 births
1975 deaths
Male actors from the Russian Empire
People from Yalta
White Russian emigrants to the United States